The Canadian Albums Chart is the official album sales chart in Canada.  It is compiled every Monday by U.S.-based music sales tracking company Nielsen SoundScan, and published every Tuesday by Billboard.

See also
 RPM (magazine)
 The Record (magazine)

References

External links
Canadian Albums Chart
Billboard Charts
Archive (2001-2004)

Canadian record charts